Polinices mammilla is a species of predatory sea snail, a marine gastropod mollusk in the family Naticidae, the moon snails.

Description

Pure white shells, rather elongated in shape, up to 4 cm; chestnut-brown, horny operculum.

Distribution
This species occurs in the Red Sea and in the Indian Ocean off Kenya, Madagascar, Mauritius, Tanzania, Transkei and is also found in the Central Indo-Pacific Ocean and in the west Pacific Ocean off Papua New Guinea and Australia.

References

 Dautzenberg, Ph. (1929). Mollusques testacés marins de Madagascar. Faune des Colonies Francaises, Tome III
 Kabat A.R., Finet Y. & Way K. (1997) Catalogue of the Naticidae (Mollusca: Gastropoda) described by C.A. Récluz, including the location of the type specimens. Apex 12(1): 15-26
 Richmond, M. (Ed.) (1997). A guide to the seashores of Eastern Africa and the Western Indian Ocean islands. Sida/Department for Research Cooperation, SAREC: Stockholm, Sweden. . 448 pp
 Torigoe K. & Inaba A. (2011) Revision on the classification of Recent Naticidae. Bulletin of the Nishinomiya Shell Museum 7: 133 + 15 pp., 4 pls.

External links

Kabat A.R. (2000) Results of the Rumphius Biohistorical Expedition to Ambon (1990). Part 10. Mollusca, Gastropoda, Naticidae. Zoologische Mededelingen 73(25): 345-380

Naticidae
Gastropods described in 1758
Taxa named by Carl Linnaeus